Barefoot Boy is Larry Coryell's only studio album for the Flying Dutchman label, a company created by Impulse! Records founder Bob Thiele. The album was produced by Thiele with assistance from Lillian Seyfert and engineered by Eddie Kramer. Barefoot Boy was recorded at Electric Ladyland, New York, United States.

Track listing

Credits
 Larry Coryell – guitar
 Steve Marcus – soprano saxophone (1, 2), tenor saxophone (3)
 Mike Mandel – piano (3)
 Mervin Bronson – bass (2, 3)
 Roy Haynes – drums
 Lawrence Killian – conga
 Harry Wilkinson – percussion

 Bob Thiele – producer 
 Lillian Seyfert – assistant producer
 Eddie Kramer – sound mixer
 Bob Palmer – liner notes
 Bob Gruen – cover & liner photographs

Reception
At AllMusic, critic Jim Newsom writes about Barefoot Boy that:

References

1971 albums
Larry Coryell albums
Albums produced by Bob Thiele
Flying Dutchman Records albums
Atco Records albums